Schach may refer to:

 Schach, the German term for chess
 S'chach,  material to cover huts, for the Jewish festival of Sukkot
 Elazar Shach (1899–2001), Haredi rabbi
 Gerhard Schach  (1906–1972), Nazi politician